Pameacha Pond is a body of water in Middletown, Connecticut, located along South Main Street (Route 17). The pond exists behind a roughly 10.5 foot high by 83 foot long rough stone dam long.

Inspections
A 1980 inspection report indicated the dam structure appeared to be in poor condition. In 2018, another inspection report promoted the city of Middletown to enter into a consent decree to repair, replace, or remove the dam, as well as repair a sanitary sewer line that passed near the structure. A conceptual plan prepared by city that would remove the damn and build a park along the bottom of the former pond met local opposition.

References

Ponds of Connecticut
Middletown, Connecticut